Yo! Majesty is an American hip hop group consisting of singer and rappers Shunda K and Shon B, produced by UK-based electro group HardfeelingsUK.

Yo! Majesty was mentioned as one of the 'Top 11 new bands of 2008' by NME magazine as well as one of the '25 Most Exciting Bands in America'.

Biography
Yo! Majesty's current members are W, Shon Burt, stage name Shon B, and LaShunda Flowers, known as Shunda K. The group members are openly lesbian and self-identify as Christian. Their sound is a hybrid of crunk, Baltimore club music, and electro, and they have garnered comparisons to punk for their defiance of labels and creation of new sounds.

Rappers Shunda K and Shon B started out as a duo named Yeah Majesty before they were rounded out circa 2001 by gospel-raised vocalist Jwl B. They started collaborating with London-based electronica duo HardfeelingsUK (David Alexander and Richard Winstanley), who supplied Yo! Majesty with their electro-rap club beats, in 2002. After a hiatus during Shunda K's marriage, Yo! Majesty regrouped. Once they established a name for themselves on the underground club circuit, both in the US and the UK, Yo! Majesty self-released their first official release, the Yo EP, in 2006.

They "made a splash" at SXSW in 2007 and that year toured alongside CSS and Gossip. Yo! Majesty has also toured with Peaches and was featured in her parody video of the Black Eyed Peas' "My Humps" called "My Dumps". The group signed with Domino Records in 2007, and the label released an EP and full-length record by the band in 2008, which included a track produced by Basement Jaxx.

A documentary based on the band, Das Wassup, directed by Johannes Schaff, was released in 2017.

Discography

Albums

Appears on

Singles
2009: "Don't Let Go"
2021: "FLEX Maxi Single"
2022: "FLEX - The Belgian Stallion Remix"

References

External links

 (https://yomajesty.bandcamp.com/)

Musical groups from Tampa, Florida
African-American musical groups
LGBT-themed musical groups
American hip hop groups
LGBT hip hop musicians
LGBT people from Florida
Domino Recording Company artists